The Chismon Collection is a collection of Croatian philatelic material formed by Harvey John Chismon and given to the British Library by his son Joseph Chismon in 2009. It forms part of the British Library Philatelic Collections.

See also
Postage stamps and postal history of Croatia

References

External links
The Chronology of Postal Authorities Issuing Stamps in Croatia and Bosnia-Herzegovina.

British Library Philatelic Collections
Philately of Croatia